Liebertwolkwitz is an outlying settlement and Ortsteil of Leipzig on the city's south side. It was established in or before 1040.

Before the local government boundary reform in 1999, it was an administratively independent municipality.

History

Origins
The first surviving record of the place, then identified as "Niwolkesthorp", dates from 1040. It is likely to have originated in the 7th or 8th century, however, as a Slavic settlement.

Church
Fire destroyed the Romanesque church in 1575.  It was replaced with a rectangular structure which featured a stout tower at its west end.   In 1702 this tower was rebuilt in the Baroque style, which left it taller and more ornate.

The Battle of the Nations
Monarchenhügel (''Monarchs' Hill), part of the higher ground within the territory of Liebertwolkwitz, is of particular historical significance.   It was from here, in October 1813 as fighting reached its climax, that the Austrian Emperor, the Russian Czar and the Prussian King oversaw their armies against Napoleon in the four-day Battle of Leipzig.   Casualties were high on both sides, but the coalition of the three emperors won, turning the tide of the Great War (as it was known to the English at the time) decisively against the French.   One victim of the battle was a church organ which had been built back in 1725 by Zacharias Hildebrandt, a contemporary and friend of Bach.

Two days before the climax, the so-called "Cavalry Clash of Liebertwolkwitz" ("Gefecht bei Liebertwolkwitz") in open countryside to the south of the town took place.   The Prussian Dragoon Lieutenant Guido von der Lippe attacked the French Marshal Murat who was poorly protected, but was nevertheless able to get away from von Lippe who was diverted by a French equerry who himself was killed while Murat fled.   The skirmish was immortalised much later in a painting by Richard Knötel.

Modern developments
Large-scale industrial development came to Liebertwolkwitz around 1880, with the production processes making use of the Clay minerals mined locally.   The industry-sector remains important to the local economy.

In 1908 the municipal bathhouse was built:  today it houses a fitness club.

The name 
The fifteen character four syllable name of Liebertwolkwitz is often shortened locally to "Wolks": residents may refer to themselves as "Wolkser".

Town twinning 
Since 1996 Liebertwolkwitz has been twinned with Les Epesses, a small town in rural western France.

Celebrities 
 At the end of the seventeenth century the manor of Liebertwolkwitz was acquired by the Poet-Writer Heinrich Anselm von Ziegler und Kliphausen, who died here in 1697.
 The footballer René Adler was born in Liebertwolkwitz in 1985.

References

External links 

 
 

Geography of Leipzig
Former municipalities in Saxony